Burila Mare is a commune located in Mehedinți County, Oltenia, Romania. It is composed of five villages: Burila Mare, Crivina, Izvoru Frumos, Țigănași and Vrancea.

Natives
 Ștefan Burileanu
 Ioan-Iovitz Popescu

References

Communes in Mehedinți County
Localities in Oltenia